Jack of Hearts (Swedish: Hjärter Knekt) is a 1950 Swedish drama film directed by Hasse Ekman and starring Ekman, Hans Strååt, Margareta Fahlén and Eva Dahlbeck. It was shot at the Centrumateljéerna Studios in Stockholm and on location around the city. The film's sets were designed by the art director Bibi Lindström.

Plot summary
Lieutenant Anders Canitz only interests in life are women and horses. He lives on inherited money and has spent all of it. When he finds out that his brother leaves home for a while to meet with an old flame of his, Anders seduces his brothers wife. He breaks hearts, ruin other peoples relationships, lies and cheats with no regrets, or has he?

Cast
Hasse Ekman as Anders Canitz, Lieutenant
Margareta Fahlén as Elsa Canitz, his sister-in law
Hans Strååt as Wilhelm Canitz, Anders brother
Eva Dahlbeck as Gun Lovén, writer
Holger Löwenadler as Krister Bergencreutz
Gertrud Fridh as Charlotta Ulfhammar, Kristers fiancée
Åke Fridell as Berra 
Dagmar Ebbesen as Kristina Lundgren, Anders housekeeper
Hjördis Petterson as Elisabeth Canitz, Anders and Wilhelms sister
Ingrid Thulin as Gunvor Ranterud
Tord Stål as Director Benzel
Sif Ruud as Prostitute
Yvonne Lombard as Margareta Lieven
Margit Andelius as fröken Appellöf, Secretary 
 Signe Wirff as Mrs. Hallgren 
Barbro Larsson as Girl in the grass
 Börje Mellvig as 	Car Driver
 Fylgia Zadig as 	Woman in Car
 Georg Fernqvist as 	Karlsson 
 Gabriel Rosén as 	Jönsson 
 Nils Hultgren as 	Wahlberg
 Margot Lindén as 	Ingrid

References

Bibliography
 Gustafsson, Fredrik. The Man from the Third Row: Hasse Ekman, Swedish Cinema and the Long Shadow of Ingmar Bergman. Berghahn Books, 2016.

External links

1950 films
Films directed by Hasse Ekman
1950s Swedish-language films
Swedish drama films
1950 drama films
Swedish black-and-white films
1950s Swedish films